Paravakkottai  is a village in the Mannargudi Taluk of Thiruvarur district, Tamil Nadu, India. It is surrounded by rivers, ponds, and paddy and banana fields. Palayakkottai consist of many streets like North street, South street, Middle street, West Street, Main Road street. The streets are arranged in such a manner that all the streets end in the river bed. A nearby town to the north is  Mannargudi and west is Thirumakkottai. Palayakkottai earns foreign money through its globally spread out community. Each family has at least one member working abroad. Most of them are in Singapore only. So this village is also called as " Kutty Singapore " (mini Singapore).

References

Villages in Tiruvarur district